Kinookimaw is a hamlet in Saskatchewan. It is on Old 16 Rd/Fifth Base Line, southeast of Regina, Saskatchewan. The name comes from the Cree name kinokamâw "it is a long body of water".

Unincorporated communities in Saskatchewan